Bret Maverick: The Lazy Ace is a 1981 American Western television film released as the 2-hour pilot episode of the series Bret Maverick, trimmed to a quicker pace and repackaged as a TV-movie for rerunning on local television stations. The 1981 show was based on the 1957 series Maverick, catching up with professional poker-player Bret Maverick (James Garner). The film, written by Gordon T. Dawson and directed by Stuart Margolin, occasionally appears under the simpler title Bret Maverick.

The real pilot, however, of both this series and the preceding CBS show Young Maverick, could be said to be the 1979 TV-movie The New Maverick, which featured both Garner as Bret and Jack Kelly as his brother Bart.

Cast
 James Garner as Bret Maverick
 Ed Bruce as Sheriff Tom Guthrie 
 Ramon Bieri as Elijah Crow
 Richard Hamilton as Cy Whittaker
 John Shearin as Sheriff Mitchel Dowd
 David Knell as Rodney Catlow
 Darleen Carr as Mary Lou Springer
 Janis Paige as Mandy Packer
 Bill McKinney as Ramsey Bass
 John McLiam as Doc Holliday, Card Player
 Stuart Margolin as Philo Sandeen
 Billy Kerr as Blue-Eyed Kid, Gunfighter
 Jack Garner as Jack, Red Ox Bartender
 Luis Delgado as Shifty Delgado
 Ed Bakey as Lyman Nickerson, Card Player
 Bill Cross as Dembro
 Richard Moll as Sloate
 Chuck Mitchell as Joe Dakota, Card Player
 Duane R. Campbell as Lucas, town drunk
 Ivan J. Rado as Wolfgang Mieter, Miner who tunneled into Bank
 David H. Banks	as Delta Fox, Card Player
 Tommy Bush as Deputy Sturgess
 Ruth Estler as Townswoman
 Norman Merrill Jr. as Bank Teller
 Al Berry as Townsman
 Kirk Cameron as Boy #1
 Max Martini as Boy #2 (billed as Max Martin)

Plot 
Bret Maverick wins a saloon in a poker game and decides to end his roving ways and settle down in Sweetwater, Arizona. He takes on as a partner the former sheriff who comes with a shady background.

External links

 James Garner Interview, 3/26/2002 on the Charlie Rose Show
 James Garner interview at Archive of American Television - (c/o Google Video) - March 17, 1999
 

1981 television films
1981 Western (genre) films
American Western (genre) television films
Films directed by Stuart Margolin
Maverick (TV series)
1980s English-language films